In coding theory, Zemor's algorithm, designed and developed by Gilles Zemor, is a recursive low-complexity approach to code construction.  It is an improvement over the algorithm of Sipser and Spielman.

Zemor considered a typical class of Sipser–Spielman construction of expander codes, where the underlying graph is bipartite graph. Sipser and Spielman introduced a constructive family of asymptotically good linear-error codes together with a simple parallel algorithm that will always remove a constant fraction of errors.  The article is based on Dr. Venkatesan Guruswami's course notes

Code construction 

Zemor's algorithm is based on a type of expander graphs called Tanner graph. The construction of code was first proposed by Tanner. Let  be the number of vertices in each group, i.e, .

It means that  and  make up, respectively, the vertex set and edge set of  regular graph .

Let us call the code  constructed in this way as  code. For a given graph  and a given code , there are several  codes as there are different ways of ordering edges incident to a given vertex , i.e., . In fact our code  consist of all codewords such that  for all .

In this figure, . It shows the graph  and code .

Two important claims are made:

Claim 1 

. Let  be the rate of a linear code constructed from a bipartite graph whose digit nodes have degree  and whose subcode nodes have degree . If a single linear code with parameters  and rate  is associated with each of the subcode nodes, then .

Proof 
Let  be the rate of the linear code, which is equal to 
Let there are  subcode nodes in the graph. These equations may not be linearly independent. 
Therefore, 

Claim 2 

 
  

If  is linear code of rate , block code length , and minimum relative distance , and if  is the edge vertex incidence graph of a  – regular graph with second largest eigenvalue , then the code  has rate at least  and minimum relative distance at least .

 Proof 
Let  be derived from the  regular graph .

As a result, any set of  variables will be having at least  constraints as neighbours. So the average number of variables per constraint is : 
           

Therefore,  cannot have a non zero codeword of relative weight    or less.

It is called Ramanujan graph as it satisfies the inequality . If the graph  is Ramanujan graph, then that expression   will become  eventually as  becomes large.

 Zemor's algorithm 

Here edges associated with a vertex on one side of a graph are not incident to other vertex on that side. The vertex processing can also be done in parallel.

The decoder stands for a decoder for  that recovers correctly with any codewords with less than  errors.

 Decoder algorithm 

Received word :  
For   to  do         // is the number of iterations
{ if ( is odd)                                       // Here the algorithm will alternate between its two vertex sets.

else      
Iteration : For every , let  // Decoding  to its nearest codeword.
}
Output: 

 Explanation of the algorithm 

Since  is bipartite, the set  of vertices induces the partition of the edge set  =  . The set  induces another partition,  =  .

Let  be the received vector, and recall that .

The iteration will yield a new vector .

 Theorem If  is a Ramanujan graph of sufficiently high degree, for any , the decoding algorithm can correct  errors, in  rounds ( where the big-  notation hides a dependence on ). This can be implemented in linear time on a single processor; on  processors each round can be implemented in constant time.''

Proof 

Since the  decoding algorithm is insensitive to the value of the edges and by linearity, we can assume that the transmitted codeword is the all zeros - vector. Let the received codeword be . The set of edges which has an incorrect value while decoding is considered. Here by incorrect value, we mean  in any of the bits. Let  be the initial value of the codeword,  be the values after first, second . . .  stages of decoding. 
Here  corresponds to those set of vertices that was not able to successfully decode their codeword in the  round. From the above algorithm   as number of unsuccessful vertices will be corrected in every iteration. We can prove that is a decreasing sequence.
In fact, . As we are assuming, the above equation is in a geometric decreasing sequence. 
So, when , more than  rounds are necessary. Furthermore, and if we implement the  round in  time, then the total sequential running time will be linear.

Drawbacks of Zemor's algorithm 
 It is lengthy process as the number of iterations  in decoder algorithm takes is 
 Zemor's decoding algorithm finds it difficult to decode erasures. A detailed way of how we can improve the algorithm is
given in.

See also

Expander codes
Tanner graph
Linear time encoding and decoding of error-correcting codes

References

Coding theory
Error detection and correction